Bathycoelia is a genus of shield bugs in the subfamily Pentatominae and the monotypic tribe Bathycoeliini.

Species
The North Dakota State University lists the following and provides a key to West African species:
 Bathycoelia alkyone Linnavuori, 1989
 Bathycoelia bifoveolatus (Reuter, 1887)
 Bathycoelia bipunctulus (Stål, 1876)
 Bathycoelia boliviensis Jensen-Haarup, 1937
 Bathycoelia buonopoziensis (Palisot de Beauvois, 1807)- type species (as  Pentatoma buonopoziensis Palisot de Beauvois)
 Bathycoelia cascadea Roche, 1977
 Bathycoelia chlorospila Walker, 1867
 Bathycoelia christyi Schouteden, 1916
 Bathycoelia conferenda Bergroth, 1891
 Bathycoelia cuneifera Bergroth, 1913
 Bathycoelia cythereia Linnavuori, 1974
 Bathycoelia decellei Schouteden, 1964
 Bathycoelia distincta Distant, 1878
 Bathycoelia dubia Jensen-Haarup, 1931
 Bathycoelia flavolimbata China, 1924
 Bathycoelia fleuria Roche, 1977
 Bathycoelia horvathi Schouteden, 1964
 Bathycoelia indica Dallas, 1851
 Bathycoelia longirostris Montrouzier, 1861
 Bathycoelia madagascariensis Reuter, 1887
 Bathycoelia malachitica Horváth, 1904
 Bathycoelia nesophila Horváth, 1904
 Bathycoelia ovalis Stål, 1865
 Bathycoelia praelongirostris Bergroth, 1893
 Bathycoelia rodhaini Schouteden, 1913
 Bathycoelia rugifossa Bergroth, 1913
 Bathycoelia scutellata Zheng & Liu, 1987
 Bathycoelia simmondsi (Izzard, 1932)
 Bathycoelia sinica Zheng & Liu, 1987
 Bathycoelia thalassina (Herrich-Schäffer, 1844)
 Bathycoelia torquatus (Herrich-Schäffer, 1844)
 Bathycoelia variolaria Distant, 1912

References

External Links

Pentatominae
Pentatomidae genera
Hemiptera of Africa
Hemiptera of Asia